Africa Research Institute (ARI) is an independent not-for-profit think-tank that was founded in February 2007. It is the only think-tank in the UK to focus exclusively on political, economic and social issues in sub-Saharan Africa. ARI strives to inform domestic and international policy making through publishing research and hosting interactive events.
ARI's mission is to draw attention to ideas or policies that have worked in Africa by highlighting and analysing best-practices in government, the economy and civil society. 
ARI encourages debate and challenges conventional wisdom in and about sub-Saharan Africa. It seeks to provide a nuanced and representative understanding of the region, as opposed to conventional "binary" depictions that often dominate the Western media.
The organisation has published work on urbanisation, political and institutional reform, regional integration, health and agriculture, amongst other issues.

History
Africa Research Institute was founded in February 2007.
Its first publication, The Day After Mugabe: prospects for change in Zimbabwe, collected a broad range of analysis and commentary from across the political spectrum, with perspectives from Africa, China, Europe and North America. The book was chosen as one of the "Best Books of 2007" by The Observer newspaper  and reviewed by Spectator magazine. 
Since then, the institute has published numerous briefing notes, articles, papers and podcasts. All of ARI's publications are in English, with a select few also published in French. 
ARI also hosts events, in the form of panel discussions, round-tables, debates and book launches . 
Mark Ashurst, a former Johannesburg correspondent for the Financial Times and BBC Africa, was the first director of ARI from 2007 to 2010. He was succeeded in 2011 by Edward Paice, a historian specialising in the Horn of Africa and Eastern Africa.

Publications

Africa Research Institute publishes works in five formats. All publications are freely available from the institute's website, and in hard copy upon request.

Policy voices

Africa Research Institute's Policy Voices series highlights instances of individual or group achievement that have important implications for policy. The contributors to this series are able to draw on extensive expertise in their respective specialist field. 
The Policy Voices series was launched in December 2008, with the publication of Feeding five thousand: the case for indigenous crops in Zimbabwe by Paul Chidara Muchineripi, and Think small: The example of small grants in Madagascar by Brian Donaldson. 
Other Policy Voices have covered diverse topics such as urban planning, tax reform, political and institutional reform, and agriculture. 

Counterpoints

The Counterpoints series seeks to critically analyse or challenge conventional assumptions about the continent. The first Counterpoints series was launched in 2010 with the publication of Why Africa can make it big in agriculture, by Mark Ashurst and Stephen Mbithi; How intellectuals made history in Zimbabwe by Blessing-Miles Tendi; and Africa through my television, by Michael Holden.

Briefing notes

ARI's Briefing Notes provide critical analyses of pertinent political and economic issues across the continent. Its first Briefing Note – Keeping peace in D.R. Congo –  was published in December 2007, and analysed the prospects for the United Nations Mission in the Democratic Republic of Congo (MONUC) in the DRC after 2007.
Since then ARI has published a host of Briefing Notes on a vast array of subjects, including the use of fertiliser subsidies in Malawi, democratic elections, the role of China in Africa and land reform in South Africa.

Conversations

The Conversations series offers insights into the perspectives of high-level politicians or civil servants on wide-ranging and overarching issues concerning sub-Saharan Africa.
The first edition of the Conversations series, released in 2013, features an interview with China's Special Representative on African Affairs, Zhong Jianhua, to provide a Chinese perspective on China's engagement with Africa, and a direct answer to accusation by former Nigerian Central bank Governor, Lamido Sanusi, that Chinese investment in Africa has contributed to its "deindustrialisation and underdevelopment".

Papers

Africa Research Institute's Papers provide an in-depth exploration of a specific issue or subject. Through this format, ARI has explored the potential of regional integration in poverty reduction, parliamentary accountability in Tanzania and agricultural subsidies in Malawi.

Events

Africa Research Institute hosts several events a year, including public panel discussions or debates, around subjects related to its publications. These events are attended by people from various sectors, including academia, diplomacy, civil society, and the private sector.

Funding

Africa Research Institute is a UK-registered charity, number 1118470. It receives funding from the family foundation of Richard Smith, a British industrialist who is also chairman of the board.

Advisory board

 Professor David Anderson, professor of African history, University of Warwick
 Brian Donaldson, patron of the Madagascar Development Fund and Former British High Commissioner and Ambassador
 Dr Steven Mbithi, chief executive of Fresh Produce Exporters' Association, Kenya
 Paul Chidara Muchineripi, director of Business Training and Development, a Harare-based consultancy
 Angela Nguku, co-ordinator, AMREF Virtual Nursing School
 Dr Jeggan C. Senghor, senior research fellow at the Institute of Commonwealth Studies, University of London
 Michela Wrong, journalist and author
 Dr Deborah Potts, senior lecturer in geography at King's College London (KCL)
 Dr Janet Chikaya-Banda, Solicitor General and Permanent Secretary of Justice of Malawi
 Professor Vanessa Watson, head of the City and Regional planning Masters programme at the School of Architecture, Planning and Geomatics, University of Cape Town
 Fouzia Mohamed Ismail, co-founder and executive director of the Somaliland Nursing and Midwifery Association (SLNMA)
 Dr Phil Clark, reader in comparative and international politics, School of Oriental and African Studies (SOAS), University of London

Partner organisations
 Association of African Planning Schools
 African Centre for Cities, University of Cape Town
 Burundi Revenue Authority/ Office burundais des recettes
 Malawi Law Commission
 Sierra Leone National Electoral Commission 
 Amref Health Africa
 Centre for Urban Research and Innovations, University of Nairobi 
 Common Market for Eastern and Southern Africa (COMESA)
 Fresh Produce Exporters' Association of Kenya
 School of Oriental and African Studies (SOAS), University of London
 King's College London, Department of Geography
 African Studies Centre, University of Oxford
 Zed Books

See also

 List of think tanks in the United Kingdom
 Overseas Development Institute
 Institute of Development Studies
 Codesria

References

External links
 Official site

African studies
Think tanks established in 2007
Political and economic think tanks based in the United Kingdom
Foreign policy and strategy think tanks based in the United Kingdom
Charities based in London
Research institutes in the United Kingdom